Louis Jules Ernest Malinvaud (26 September 1836, in Paris – 22 September 1913) was a French physician and botanist.

Beginning in 1860, he studied medicine in Limoges and later Paris (from 1863). After serving as a doctor during the Franco-Prussian War, he left the medical practice in order to concentrate his energies towards botany. As a botanist he collaborated with Pierre Marie Édouard Lamy de la Chapelle (1804–1886).

In 1861 he became a member of the Société botanique de France. The plant genus Malinvaudia (subfamily Asclepiadaceae) was named after him by Eugène Pierre Nicolas Fournier (1834-1884).

References 

19th-century French botanists
Scientists from Paris
1836 births
1913 deaths
19th-century French physicians
French people of the Franco-Prussian War
20th-century French botanists